Feiyunjiang Bridge is a bridge in Rui'an, Zhejiang. Construction of the bridge began in 2003, and it became usable soon after. The bridge was made to prevent traffic from slowing down trucks and trains.

References

Bridges in China